Valley Plaza Mall is a shopping mall in Bakersfield, California. It is the largest mall in the San Joaquin Valley. The mall is situated near California State Route 99, the city's main north–south freeway. Anchor stores are Forever 21, JCPenney, Macy's, and Target.

History
Valley Plaza Mall opened in 1967. The mall was originally developed by The Hahn Company of San Diego in partnership with John Brock Sr. of Brock's Department Stores. The mall originally had  of retail space and three anchor stores: Sears, The Broadway, and Brock's. The original interior was described as "reflects the Spanish influence on Southern California in a contemporary manner".

In 1986, the mall began expanding, adding "wings" (which increased the mall to its current size) on the east end in 1986, and the west in 1988. Two new anchor stores were added: JCPenney (1986) and May Company (1988). The Oasis Food Court was also constructed. In 1997, Pacific Theaters opened a 15-screen theater on the property, but detached from the mall. It contained a mural in the lobby which featured the newly remodeled Bakersfield Sign. It was one of the first large public displays of the sign since the remodel.

The anchor stores saw many changes. Only JCPenney has remained since they originally opened. Broadway was acquired by Macy's. Brock's was purchased by Gottschalks, which later closed and became occupied by Forever 21. May Company became Robinsons-May, and it closed and eventually was demolished and replaced by Target.

The mall also has a 16-screen movie theater, with IMAX. It is detached from the mall and is owned by Reading Cinemas.

Valley Plaza Mall is the site of the Southwest Transit Center, which has a stop for the following Golden Empire Transit (GET) routes: 2, 6, 7, 8, 10, 11, 13, and 15.

On October 15, 2018, it was announced that Sears would be closing as part of a plan to close 142 stores nationwide. The store closed on January 6, 2019.

References

External links
Valley Plaza Mall

 

1967 establishments in California
Brookfield Properties
Buildings and structures in Bakersfield, California
Shopping malls established in 1967
Shopping malls in Kern County, California
Tourist attractions in Bakersfield, California